NCAA refers to the National Collegiate Athletic Association, a non-profit association in the United States and Canada.

NCAA may also refer to:
National Collegiate Athletic Association (Philippines), an unrelated athletics association in the Philippines
Namibia Civil Aviation Authority
Nigerian Civil Aviation Authority
Norwegian Civil Aviation Administration
Non-canonical amino acids, also called non-proteinogenic amino acids